Adrian Vanson (died c. 1602) was a portrait artist who worked for James VI of Scotland.

Family and artistic background
Adrian was probably born in Breda, the son of Willem Claesswen van Son by Kathelijn Adriaen Matheus de Blauwverversdochter. His uncle or cousin Peter Mattheus or Matteusen was a painter in London.

Peter Matheeusen in his 1588 will left his cousin Adrian Vanson, named as "Adryan van Zont", portraits of his parents, Jacob and Agnes, and of himself, with a book The Arte concerning Lymning. Amongst the other bequests, Matheussen left money to the miniaturist Isaac Oliver and the painter Rowland Lockey, best known as a copyist working for Bess of Hardwick and her son the Earl of Devonshire.

In Edinburgh he signed his name "Adrian Van Son". His relative or brother Abraham Vanson was in Edinburgh working as a goldsmith, and married Jonet Gilbert, a niece of the wealthy goldsmith and financier Michael Gilbert.

Career in Scotland
Adrian's first recorded works for James VI in Scotland were two pictures to be sent to Theodore Beza in Geneva, for which he was paid £8-10s in June 1581. These portraits of John Knox and George Buchanan had been sent to Geneva in November 1579 for inclusion as woodcuts in Theodore Beza's Icones (1580), but arrived too late for the book. The woodcuts of Knox and James VI published in Simon Goulart's 1581 edition of the Icones are thought to follow Vanson's portraits. Another woodcut image of George Buchanan, not used in the Icones, but appearing in other works, has been attributed to Arnold Bronckorst.

In October 1582, Mary, Queen of Scots, wrote to the French ambassador Michel de Castelnau in cipher code about a new type of portrait of James VI that he had sent her, presumably differing from the pictures made by Arnold Bronckorst.

He may have been 'Lord Seton's painter', who was recorded drawing portraits for coins at the mint in Edinburgh in 1582, to be used by Thomas Foulis. Lord Seton had served as a diplomat and had various European contacts, and his third son John Seton of Barns had joined the household of the Earl of Leicester in England 1575.

Vanson also painted heraldry on banners for the king's trumpeters, and ceremonial spears and banners and painted the Danish royal arms on banners for the coronation of Anne of Denmark.

Adrian Vanson succeeded Arnold Bronckhorst as "King's painter" in Scotland in May 1584. His appointment and yearly fee of £100 was confirmed by privy seal letter on 20 August 1584. When he was made a burgess of Edinburgh in December 1585, it was hoped he would teach his craft to apprentices. No records of apprentices, or a workshop have been found. Vanson did not join the Edinburgh craft of Mason and Wrights, which welcomed painter-glaziers.

Attributed portraits include James VI; Anne of Denmark; Patrick Lyon, Lord Glamis; Sir Thomas Kennedy of Culzean; Agnes Douglas, Countess of Argyll. Vanson's James VI of circa 1585 survives at Edinburgh castle. Some pictures are known through later copies or imitations, including a portrait of James Anstruther originally painted in 1591.

The only painter in Edinburgh
Mary, Queen of Scots requested a full size portrait of James VI drawn from life in April 1586. In May, a French ambassador in Scotland, Courcelles, the Baron d'Esneval, promised to get Mary, Queen of Scots a copy of a recent portrait of James VI from the only painter in Edinburgh, presumably meaning Vanson. There had been rumours of an embassy to Denmark to discuss the king's marriage in April 1586. It is thought the picture at Edinburgh Castle was made by Vanson for this embassy or a similar purpose.

Maitland and the hidden portrait of Mary
A portrait of John Maitland of Thirlestane by Vanson at Ham House was valued at £2 in 1683. Examination by Caroline Rae in 2016 showed that it was painted over an image of Mary, Queen of Scots.

Prince Henry and gold medals
Portraits of Prince Henry were given to ambassadors at his christening in August 1594. James VI had gold medals with his and Anna of Denmark's portraits made, which he gave to the ambassadors at the baptism in September 1594. The medals presumably followed patterns by Vanson, and James VI gave one to Vanson worth 20 gold crowns on 3 October. The courtier Magdalen Livingstone owned a locket with a portrait of Anne of Denmark "raised" in gold. In England James commissioned medallions with his portrait from the artist Nicholas Hilliard.

Anne of Denmark
Christian IV of Denmark requested full length portraits of James VI and Anne of Denmark to add to a series of pictures of his relatives in October 1597. It is not known if this request was granted. The execution of Archibald Cornwall in April 1601 for attaching royal portraits to the gallows suggests that pictures of the king and Anne of Denmark were common household objects in Edinburgh. Miniature portraits were also made in Edinburgh, the stock of a goldsmith, the younger John Mosman, in 1593 included a "tablet" or locket with the portraits of James VI and Anne of Denmark worth £57 Scots.

In December 1601 Vanson was paid £20 Scots for a portrait of Anne of Denmark. Around the same time the goldsmith George Heriot made a chain with a miniature portrait of James as a diplomatic gift for an ambassador from the Duke of Mecklenburg, the queen's uncle. Although Vanson was still active, the Duke of Lennox later claimed that he had not been able to find a portrait painter in Scotland to send pictures of the royal family to the Venetian ambassador.

In 1604 Vanson worked with other painters on a triumphal arch for the king's ceremonial entry to London, commissioned by the Dutch community.

The date of his death is unknown. After Adrian Vanson's death, in 1610 and 1616 his widow Susanna petitioned the king for outstanding payments.

Marriage, family, and the Flemish community
Adrian Vanson married Susanna de Colonia at Dordrecht on 31 March 1577. She became an active business woman in Edinburgh. Her brother was the portrait painter Adam de Colone. Their father Louis Jansz. Colonia was a saddle maker.

Their children included:
 Adrian Vanson, who was christened on 19 October 1595, the witnesses were the Flemish ambassador Adrian Damman de Bystervelt and Adrian Bowdowingis, a clockmaker. On 26 October 1600 Adrian Bowdowingis christened his son Adrian, and Adrian Damman and Adrian Vanson were witnesses.
 Susanna Vanson, 
 James Vanson
 Frederick Vanson

Vanson acted with the Flemish ambassador Adrian Damman in two shipping cases in May 1594. The first involved Hendrick Michelsoun, a skipper from Middelburg, Zeeland, who was imprisoned in the Tolbooth of Edinburgh. Vanson and Damman gave a bond of £1000 Scots to release him into house arrest with Vanson.

In the second case, they put up a bond of £2000, "making caution", for Peter Herimansoun and Peter Mattiesoun, two sailors who arrived in a ship at Montrose, which had been impounded and taken at Leith. The sailors were to remain in Edinburgh, Canongate, or Leith until the issue (not specified) was settled.

External links
 Adrian Vanson at the National Galleries of Scotland
 James VI by Adrian Vanson, at Edinburgh Castle, (Historic Scotland)
 Medal commemorating the marriage of James VI and Anne of Denmark, Royal Museums Greenwich
 Caroline Rae, 'All that glitters is not gold', technical examination of a 1595 portrait of James VI
 Identity and authenticity: a newly discovered contemporary portrait of Mary, Queen of Scots
 'Portrait of Mary, Queen of Scots Discovered Under Painting by Adrian Vanson', CODART
 Information on the Edinburgh Castle Vanson from Philip Mould Ltd
 Margaret Graham by Adam de Colone, National Galleries of Scotland
 James Erskine, 6th earl of Buchan by Adam de Colone, National Galleries of Scotland

Footnotes

16th-century Flemish painters
Year of birth unknown
Scottish portrait painters
Flemish portrait painters
16th-century Scottish painters
Scottish male painters
Renaissance artists
Year of death unknown
Court painters
Court of James VI and I